Skanless is the debut studio album by American rapper Hi-C from Compton, California. It was released on December 10, 1991, via Skanless Records. The album peaked at number 152 on the Billboard 200, number 53 on the Top R&B Albums chart, and number 3 on the Heatseekers Albums chart. It spawned three singles: "I'm Not Your Puppet", "Leave My Curl Alone" and "Sitting In The Park", which peaked at number 21 on the Hot Rap Songs.

Track listing

Samples
I'm Not Your Puppet
"I'm Your Puppet" by James & Bobby Purify
"Hook and Sling - Part I" by Eddie Bo
"Impeach The President" by The Honey Drippers
"Have Your Ass Home by 11:00" by Richard Pryor
"Atomic Dog" by George Clinton
"Colors" by Ice-T
"Dopeman" by N.W.A
"Kissing My Love" by Bill Withers
"Go See the Doctor" by Kool Moe Dee
"Paul Revere" by Beastie Boys
"Just Say No" by Toddy Tee feat. Mix Master Spade
"La Di Da Di" by Doug E. Fresh and MC Ricky D
Leave My Curl Alone
"Dusic" by Brick
"Back to Life (However Do You Want Me)" by Soul II Soul
Sitting in the Park
"Sitting in the Park" by Billy Stewart
2 Skanless
"Tramp" by Lowell Fulson
"Dizzy" by Tommy Roe
"You Can Make It If You Try" by Sly & the Family Stone
"The Payback" by James Brown
Froggy Style
"Funky Drummer" by James Brown
Punk S***
"Funky Drummer" by James Brown
"All Because" by Al Green
"The New Scooby-Doo Movies" by Hoyt Curtin
"High" by Skyy
"So Ruff, So Tuff" by Roger Troutman

Personnel

Crawford Wilkerson – main artist, producer (tracks: 4, 5, 8, 10, 11)
David Marvin Blake – featured artist (track 17), producer (tracks: 5, 8, 10)
Kelton L. McDonald – featured artist (tracks: 11, 17), backing vocals (tracks: 3, 11)
Jason Lewis – featured artist (track 17)
Deon Barnett – backing vocals (tracks: 3, 11)
Angel Montes – featured artist (track 6)
Curtis Harmon – featured artist (track 6)
Kat Martinez – featured artist (track 6)
Nikki Scire – featured artist (track 6)
Big Jazz – featured artist (track 14)
Desiree – backing vocals (track 3)
Nicole – backing vocals (track 3)
Robert C. Bacon, Jr. – rhythm guitar (tracks: 4, 5, 8, 10, 13, 14), bass (tracks: 4, 10, 13, 14)
Stuart Wylen – guitar & keyboards (tracks: 7, 8)
Mike "Crazy Neck" Sims – bass & guitar (tracks: 9, 16)
Tony Robert Alvarez – producer (tracks: 3, 4, 7, 9, 11, 13, 14, 16, 17)
Steve Yano – producer (tracks: 7, 16), executive producer
Brian "B-Sly" Foxworthy – engineering & mixing (tracks: 1-8, 10-15, 17)
Donovan Smith – engineering & mixing (tracks: 9, 16)
Ron McMaster – mastering
Maria DeGrassi-Colosimo – art direction
Jamile G. Mafi – design
Susan Werner – photography

Charts

References

External links

1991 debut albums
Hi-C (rapper) albums
Albums produced by DJ Quik
Hollywood Records albums